Boldi is an Italian surname. Notable people with the surname include:

Benito Boldi (1934–2021), Italian footballer
Massimo Boldi (born 1945), Italian stand-up comedian and actor

Italian-language surnames